Norman Alexander Robertson,  (March 4, 1904 – July 16, 1968) was a Canadian diplomat and was one of Prime Minister Mackenzie King's advisers.

Background and early life

Born in Vancouver, British Columbia, he was educated at the University of British Columbia and was a Rhodes Scholar attending Balliol College, Oxford.

In 1929 he started with the Department of External Affairs.

Senior diplomatic appointments

In 1941, he became Under Secretary of State for External Affairs.

From 1946 to 1949 and 1952 to 1957, he was Canadian High Commissioner in London, during which time he participated at the Coronation of Queen Elizabeth II as Standard Bearer, and from 1957 to 1958 he was Canadian Ambassador in Washington, D.C.

Honours; death

In 1967, he was made a Companion of the Order of Canada. Robertson is buried at Maclaren Cemetery in Wakefield, Quebec. Robertson is buried at the same cemetery as fellow diplomats and friends Hume Wrong and Lester B. Pearson.

References

Further reading
 Granatstein, J. L. A man of influence: Norman A. Robertson and Canadian statecraft, 1929-68 (1981) scholarly biography; online

External links
 Norman Alexander Robertson at The Canadian Encyclopedia

1904 births
1968 deaths
Alumni of Balliol College, Oxford
Ambassadors of Canada to the United States
Canadian Rhodes Scholars
Clerks of the Privy Council (Canada)
Companions of the Order of Canada
High Commissioners of Canada to the United Kingdom
People from Vancouver
University of British Columbia alumni